Musallem Fayez Muftah Hamdan Al Hamdani (Arabic: مسلم فايز مفتاح حمدان الحمداني; born 1 January 1987) is an Emarati footballer who plays for Al-Dhafra as defender. He played for 4 matches with Al Ain FC at 2010 AFC Champions League.

References

External links
 Msalam Profile At Al Ain Fc.net Official Site
  Msalam Statistics At Goalzz.com

Emirati footballers
1987 births
Living people
UAE Pro League players
Association football defenders
Al Ain FC players
Al Jazira Club players
Al Dhafra FC players